Hugh John Plaxton (May 16, 1904 — December 1, 1982) was a Canadian ice hockey player and politician. During his hockey career he competed in the 1928 Winter Olympics, winning a gold medal with Canada, and later played 17 games in the National Hockey League with the Montreal Maroons during the 1932–33 season. In his political career he served in the House of Commons of Canada from 1935 to 1940, representing Trinity as a member of the Liberal Party.

Playing career
In 1928 he was a member of the University of Toronto Grads, the Canadian team which won the gold medal with his brother Herbert and cousin Roger. He also played NHL hockey for the Montreal Maroons in the 1932–33 season.

Political career
After retiring from hockey, Plaxton qualified as a lawyer and entered politics. He was elected to parliament in the 1935 federal election as a Liberal MP from the Toronto riding of Trinity defeating Minister of Justice and former Toronto mayor George Reginald Geary. He lost the Liberal Party nomination in 1940 federal election to former Ontario Attorney-General Arthur Roebuck but attempted to return to Parliament in the 1945 federal election running in the riding of Kingston City where he was defeated by Conservative Thomas Kidd.

In January 1937, Plaxton introduced a resolution in the House of Commons of Canada to propose the establishment of a Canadian ministry of sports. He stated it had potential to take over administration of sports and eliminate "disputes over authority and jurisdiction". Amateur Athletic Union of Canada (AAU of C) president Jack Hamilton felt that the ministry might be beneficial, and that sport could be promoted with the help of department of health and reach more areas of Canada. He wanted more discussion on what would happen to sports organizations if the government took control or organized sports, but stated that the AAU of C would co-operate.

Plaxton was one of two former hockey players to have been elected a Member of Parliament for Trinity, the other being Lionel Conacher who was elected as a Liberal MP for the riding in 1949 and 1953.

Personal life
Plaxton lived in Mississauga's Port Credit area by 1948.

Career statistics

Regular season and playoffs

International

References

External links
 
 

1904 births
1982 deaths
20th-century Canadian lawyers
Canadian ice hockey players
Ice hockey people from Ontario
Ice hockey players at the 1928 Winter Olympics
Lawyers in Ontario
Liberal Party of Canada MPs
Medalists at the 1928 Winter Olympics
Members of the House of Commons of Canada from Ontario
Montreal Maroons players
Ontario Hockey Association Senior A League (1890–1979) players
Olympic gold medalists for Canada
Olympic ice hockey players of Canada
Olympic medalists in ice hockey
Sportspeople from Barrie
Toronto Varsity Blues ice hockey players
Windsor Bulldogs (1929–1936) players